Trond Espen Seim (born 4 October 1971) is a Norwegian actor.

He has played private detective Varg Veum in a series of films based on the eponymous series of novels by Gunnar Staalesen. On 18 March 2010, Seim was cast in the film The Thing, which premiered on 14 October 2011 in the United States and 2 December 2011 in the United Kingdom.

Selected filmography

Varg Veum films
 Bitre blomster (September 2007)
 Tornerose (January 2008)
 Din til døden (March 2008)
 Falne engler (April 2008)
 Kvinnen i kjøleskapet (September 2008)
 Begravde hunder (October 2008)
 Skriften på veggen (August 2010)
 Svarte får (January 2011)
 Dødens drabanter (2011)
 I mørket er alle ulver grå (2011)
 De døde har det godt (2011)
 Kalde hjerter (2012) (Also director)

Television
 The Legacy (2014-2017) - Robert Eliassen
 Mammon (2016) – Prime Minister Michael Woll
 Cape Town (2016) – Mat Joubert

Other films
 I Am Dina (2002) – The First Lieutenant
 Hawaii, Oslo (2004) – Vidar 
 Troubled Water (2008) – Jon M
 The Frost (2009) – Alfred 
 The Thing (2011) – Edvard Wolner 
 Revenge (2015)
Amundsen (2019) – Fridtjof Nansen

References

External links
 

1971 births
Living people
Norwegian male film actors
Male actors from Oslo